The John von Neumann Computer Society is the central association for Hungarian researchers of Information communication technology and official partner of the International Federation for Information Processing founded in 1968.

References

External links
Official website

Professional associations based in Hungary
Information technology organizations based in Europe
Computer science organizations
Organizations established in 1968